Eremophila occidens is a flowering plant in the figwort family, Scrophulariaceae and is endemic to Western Australia. It is a slender, erect shrub with branches that are hairy at first, light green leaves crowded at the ends of the branches and purple to deep violet flowers in early Spring. It is restricted to the extreme west of Western Australia.

Description
Eremophila occidens is usually an erect, slender shrub growing to a height of  often with many tangled branches lower down. Its younger stems are densely covered with simple, branched and glandular hairs. They have prominent raised lumps, especially on the lower surface and a raised mid-vein on the lower surface.

The petal tube is purple to deep violet and the outer surface of the petal tube and both surfaces of its lobes are glabrous, while the inside of the tube is filled with long, soft hairs. The 4 stamens are fully enclosed in the petal tube.

Taxonomy and naming 
The species was first formally described by Robert Chinnock in 2007 and the description was published in Eremophila and Allied Genera: A Monograph of the Plant Family Myoporaceae. The specific epithet (occidens) is derived from the Latin word occidens meaning "west" or "in the direction of the setting sun".

Distribution and habitat
Eremophila occidens occurs in two disjunct populations, one on the Cape Range and the other at Shark Bay in the Carnarvon and Yalgoo biogeographic regions. The Cape Range population grows on calcareous soils in open heath and the Shark Bay population grows between sand dunes in shrubland.

Conservation
This species is classified as "Priority Two" by the Western Australian Government Department of Parks and Wildlife meaning that is poorly known and from only one or a few locations.

References

Eudicots of Western Australia
occidens
Endemic flora of Western Australia
Plants described in 2007
Taxa named by Robert Chinnock